Shorea lamellata (called, along with some other species in the genus Shorea, white meranti) is a species of plant in the family Dipterocarpaceae. It is a tree found in Sumatra and Peninsular Malaysia.

References

lamellata
Trees of Sumatra
Trees of Peninsular Malaysia
Critically endangered flora of Asia
Taxonomy articles created by Polbot